Robert Fairfax  may refer to:

Robert Fairfax, 7th Lord Fairfax of Cameron (1707–1793)
Robert Fairfax (rear-admiral) (1666–1725)
Robert Fayrfax (1464–1521), English Renaissance composer